Prince Mfanasibili ( – 15 March 2016) of Swaziland was the son of Prince Makhosikhosi who was brother to King Sobhuza II. He was a cabinet minister during the reign of Sobhuza II and became a powerful member of the Liqoqo council during the subsequent regency (1983–1986). He orchestrated the removal of Queen Dzeliwe Shongwe as Regent and saw that the Queen Mother Indlovukazi Ntombi la Tfwala replaced her. After Prince Makhosetive was installed on the throne, Mfanasibili was convicted of "defeating the ends of justice" in his actions during the regency and sentenced to seven years in prison. Mfanasibili was later given a  royal pardon.

At the time of his death 'Prince Mfanasibili was living with his wife and children in Manzini. Swaziland, where he served on the city council, and discharged his duties on behalf of the royal family. He was very active in Swazi politics and his articles were at one time featured weekly in the Sunday Times newspaper. '

Prince Mfanasibili died aged 77 on 15 March 2016.

References

1930s births
2016 deaths
Swazi royalty